The Albatros G.III (company L.21), was a German bomber aircraft development of World War I. It was a large, single-bay biplane of unequal span and unstaggered wings. Power was provided by two Benz Bz.IVa pusher engines installed in nacelles carried between the wings. An unusual feature of the design was that the lower wing was provided with cutouts for the propellers, allowing the engine nacelles to be mounted further forward than would have been otherwise possible. Few were built, these seeing service mostly on the Macedonian Front in 1917.

Operators

Luftstreitkräfte

Specifications (G.III)

References

 
 

G.III
1910s German bomber aircraft
Aircraft first flown in 1916